The Dunlop Cup was a professional golf tournament played annually in Scotland from 1909 to 1912. Robert Thomson won in 1911 and 1912 and so won the cup outright.

History
Entry was restricted to PGA members of the Scottish section and other professionals attached to a Scottish club. Prize money was £25 with £20 for the winner and £5 for the runner-up. The cup became the permanent property of any player winning it three times or two years in succession. Robert Thomson won in 1911 and 1912 and so won the cup outright. The event was played either the day after or the day before the Scottish qualifying for the News of the World Match Play.

Winners

In 1910 there was an 18-hole playoff on the following day. Kinnell scored 75, Fernie 76 and Thomson 79. Fernie took the second prize of £5.

References

Golf tournaments in Scotland
Defunct golf tournaments
Recurring sporting events established in 1909
Recurring sporting events disestablished in 1912
1909 establishments in Scotland
1912 disestablishments in Scotland